Martin David Brasier FGS, FLS (12 April 1947 – 16 December 2014) was an English palaeobiologist and astrobiologist known for his conceptual analysis of microfossils and evolution in the Precambrian and Cambrian.

He was Professor of Palaeobiology at the University of Oxford and Emeritus Fellow of St Edmund Hall. His research critically examined the context and character of the early fossil record, making use of field mapping, logging, optical petrography, stable isotope geochemistry, confocal microscopy, NanoSims microprobes, and lasers for high resolution 3D scanning and laser Raman spectroscopy.

Brasier died in a car accident near Burford, Oxfordshire, UK, on 16 December 2014.

Contributions
His contributions include the Brasier–Schopf debate on critical testing of questionable 3460 Ma Apex chert 'microfossils' at NASA; work on the earliest well-preserved fossils of cells (biology) (3430 Ma Strelley Pool); the pumice hypothesis for the origins of life; mapping the earliest life on land (1000 Ma Torridonian); and the palaeoecology, development and evolution of Ediacaran to early Cambrian organisms.  He was secretary and then leader of the International Geoscience Programme, UNESCO and International Commission on Stratigraphy Projects on the Precambrian-Cambrian Boundary decision. This defined the base of the Phanerozoic Eon, Palaeozoic Era and Cambrian Period at a section in Newfoundland and Labrador based upon the appearance of the first assemblage of vertical burrowing animal trace fossils Treptichnus pedum The same datum also defines the top of the Precambrian and of the Proterozoic Eon. His own book on the subject, Darwin's Lost World was published in 2009 as part of the Charles Darwin centenary celebrations. His sequel, called Secret Chambers, goes in search of the symbiotic origins of the eukaryote chloroplast, tracing its evolution through the last two billion years, exploring the ideas of Robert Hooke, Elso Barghoorn, Tom Cavalier-Smith and Lynn Margulis, and delving into the interval that Brasier dubbed 'the Boring Billion'.

Recent awards
Lyell Medal, Geological Society of London, Burlington House, 2014 (for his research of early life)
Society of Biology first book awards nomination 2013 (for Secret Chambers)

Selected publications
Landing, E., Geyer, G., Braser, M.D., and Bowring, S. A. 2013. Cambrian Evolutionary Radiation: centext, correlation, and chronostratigraphy - overcoming deficiencies of the First Appearance Datum (FAD)concept.  Earth-Science Reviews (journal),123. 133-172
Brasier, M.D., Matthewman, R., McMahon, S. and Wacey, D. 2011. Pumice as a remarkable substrate for the origins of life. Astrobiology, 7, 725-735 
Wacey, D., Kilburn, M., Saunders, M., Cliff, J. and Brasier, M.D. 2011. Microfossils of sulphur-metabolizing cells in 3.4-billion-year-old rocks of Western Australia. Nature Geoscience, 4, 698-702 
Strother, P.K., Battison, L., Brasier, M.D. & Wellman, C.H. 2011. Earth's earliest non-marine eukaryotes. Nature. 403, 505-509
Brasier, M.D. & Antcliffe, J.B. 2009. Evolutionary relationships within the Avalonian Ediacara biota: new insights from Laser Analysis. Journal of the Geological Society, 166, 363-384 
Brasier, M.D. & Antcliffe, J. 2004. Decoding the Ediacaran Enigma. Science 305, 1115-1117 
Brasier, M.D., Green, O.R., Jephcoat, A.P., Kleppe, A.K., Van Kranendonk, M.J., Lindsay, J.F., Steele, A. & Grassineau, N.V. 2002. Questioning the evidence for Earth's oldest fossils. Nature 416, 76-81
Brasier, M.D. & Lindsay, J.F. 1998. A billion years of environmental stability and the emergence of eukaryotes. New data from northern Australia. Geology, 26, 555-558
Brasier, M.D., Cowie, J.W. & Taylor, M.E. 1994. Decision on the Precambrian- Cambrian boundary stratotype. Episodes, 17, 3–8.
Brasier, M.D. 1979. The Cambrian radiation event. In House, M.R. (ed.) 'The Origin of Major Invertebrate Groups'. Systematics Association Special Volume, 12, 103-159

Books
Brasier, M.D. 2012. Secret Chambers: the inside story of cells and complex life. Oxford University Press, 298pp.
Brasier, M.D. 2009. Darwin's Lost World: the hidden history of  animal life. Oxford University Press, 322pp., 
Cowie, J.W. and Brasier, M.D. 1989. The Precambrian-Cambrian Boundary, Oxford Monographs in Geology and Geophysics, No. 12.
Brasier, MD. 1980. Microfossils. George Allen & Unwin, London, 193pp.

References

1947 births
2014 deaths
Alumni of the University of London
British palaeontologists
Fellows of St Edmund Hall, Oxford
People from Wimbledon, London
Road incident deaths in England
Astrobiologists
Lyell Medal winners